Luis Contreras may refer to:

 Luis Contreras (actor), American actor
 Luis Contreras (boxer), Venezuelan boxer
 Luis Contreras (footballer), Salvadoran footballer
 Luis Contreras (jockey), Mexican jockey